Eparchy of Kyiv is the central eparchy (diocese) and metropolis of the Orthodox Church of Ukraine. The eparchy covers the territory of Kyiv Oblast and most of the city of Kyiv.

The seat of the Eparchy is the St. Michael's Golden-Domed Monastery cathedral in Kyiv. It is the primatial Eparchy, its head being the Metropolitan of Kyiv and all Ukraine.

There is an ongoing conflict with the "Honorary Patriarch" Filaret for whom the eparchy of Kyiv City was reserved, with its seat in St. Volodymyr Cathedral. Since Filaret was not able to become a Patriarch and the Primate of newly reorganized church, he decided to stay as Patriarch of the Ukrainian Orthodox Church - Kyiv Patriarchate.

History
The eparchy claims to trace its heritage to the original eparchy of "Kiev and all Rus'" that dates back to the establishment of the Old Russian (Ruthenian) Church under the jurisdiction of the Ecumenical Patriarchate of Constantinople. The Ruthenian archdiocese of Kiev is first mentioned in 891, as the 60th by rank of honor in the list of departments subordinate to the Patriarch of Constantinople, and 61st in the charter of Emperor Leo (886-911). From its beginnings, the eparchy was the central or primatial diocese of the metropolis, which also included a number of other dioceses that were created after the baptism of Kievan Rus' during the rule of Great Prince Vladimir in 988.

In reality, the eparchy's history starts with the Metropolis of Kiev, Galicia and all Ruthenia which was erected in 1620 and was absorbed by Moscow in 1722, or, as the Russian Orthodox Church would have it, was "transferred" from the ecclesiastical jurisdiction of Ecumenical Patriarchate of Constantinople to the Patriarchate of Moscow.

In the early 18th century, the metropolis was demoted to the rank of an archbishopric during the rule of Tsar Peter I. This lasted until the middle of the century, when the decree of Empress Elizabeth Petrovna elevated it once again to the rank of metropolis. In the 17th and 18th centuries, the diocese of Kyiv consisted of two parts: one on either bank of the Dnieper River, each of which were subsequently ceded to the provinces of Chernihiv and Poltava.

Since 1918, according to the decision of the All-Russian Church Council of 1917-1918, the bishops of Kyiv are once again the heads of not only the diocese of Kyiv, but of an autonomous Church within the borders of Ukraine. After its liquidation by order of Patriarch Tikhon, the Ukrainian Exarchate was established. The Bishops' Council of the Russian Orthodox Church, 25-27 October 1990, established the autonomous and self-governing Ukrainian Orthodox Church, with the Diocese of Kyiv as its primatial diocese.

From 2009 to 2013, the eparchy was split between right-bank (Pereyaslav-Khmelnytskyi) and left-bank (Kyiv and the all Ukraine). In 2013, the division changed with the eparchy covering Kyiv Oblast being headed by the bishop of Pereyaslav and Bila Tserkva and the City of Kyiv being headed by the Metropolitan of Kyiv and the all Ukraine.

During the unification of the Orthodox Church of Ukraine and its reorganization in 2019, the eparchy was merged again, also including the eparchy of Kyiv of the Ukrainian Autocephalous Orthodox Church. The mother church of the Ukrainian Autocephalous Orthodox Church St. Andrew's Church was reserved as a stauropegion church of the Ecumenical Patriarchate of Constantinople since the original see in the Kyiv-Pechersk Lavra is still held by the Russian Orthodox Church.

Ruling bishops

Ecumenical Patriarchate of Constantinople
 988(?)–1004(?) Michael and Leontius
 988–1018 Theophylact
 1008(?)–1017(?) John
 1037(?)–1043(?) Teopempt 
 1051–(?) Hilarion 
 1055(?)–(?) Ephraim
 1072(?)–(?) George (Jurij)
 1077(?)–1089 John II Prodrom
 1090–1091 John III
 1097–1101(?) Nicholas
 1104–1121 Nikephoros
 1122–1126 Nikita
 1130(?)–1145(?) Michael II
 1147–1159 Kliment Smoliatich
 1156–1159 Kostiantyn
 1161–1163 Teodor
 1164–1166 John IV
 1167–1177(?) Costantine II
 (?)–(?) John V
 1182(?)–1197(?) Nikephoros II
 1210(?)–1220 Matthew
 1224–1233 Сyril
 1237–(?)  Joseph
 1241–1246 Peter (Akerovich) (as Archbishop of Ruthenia), 
 1246–1620 no data
 1620–1631 Job
 1631–1633 Isaiah
 1633–1646 Peter III
 1647–1657 Sylvester
 1657–1663 Dionisius II
 1663–1675 Joseph V
 1663–1679 Anton Vinnicky
 1679–1685 vacant

Moscow Patriarchate
 Gedeon Chetvertinsky
 Varlaam Jasinsky
 Joasaph Krokovsky
 Varlaam Vonatovich
 Raphael Zaborovsky
 Timothy Shcherbatsky
 Arsenius Mohylansky
 Gavril Kremenetsky
 Hilarion Kondratovsky (acting)
 Samuel Myslavsky
 Hierothenius Malitsky
 Gavril Bănulescu-Bodoni
 Serapion Aleksandrovsky
 Yevgeny Bolkhovitinov
 Filaret Amfiteatrov
 Isidore Nikolsky
 Arsenius Moskvin
 Filothy Uspiensky
 Platon Gorodetsky
 Joannicius Rudniev
 Silvester Malevansky (acting)
 Theognost Lebiediev
 Flavian Gorodetsky
 Vladimir Bogoyavlensky
 Nicodemus (Krotkov) (acting)
 Antony (Khrapovitsky)
 Nazarius Blinov (acting)
 Michael Yermakov (acting)
 Vasilius Bogdashevsky (acting)
 Makarius Karmazin (acting)
 Michael Yermakov
 Sergius Kuminsky (acting)
 Georgius Dieliyev (acting)
 Dimitrius Verbitsky
 Sergius Grishin
 Constantine Dyakov
 Alexander Petrovsky (acting)
 Ukrainian Autonomous Orthodox Church, Panteleimon Rudyk
 John Sokolov
 Joasaph Leliukhin
 Alipius Khotovitsky (acting)

Autocephalous church
 Filaret (Denysenko)
 Epiphanius I of Ukraine

Notes

References

Bibliography

External links

Orthodox Church of Ukraine
Eastern Orthodox dioceses in Ukraine